Barannikovo is a rural locality (a selo) in Osichkovskoye Rural Settlement, Rudnyansky District, Volgograd Oblast, Russia. The population was 175 as of 2010. There are 4 streets.

Geography 
Barannikovo is located in steppe, on the Khopyorsko-Buzulukskaya Plain, 14 km north of Rudnya (the district's administrative centre) by road. Podkuykovo is the nearest rural locality.

References 

Rural localities in Rudnyansky District, Volgograd Oblast